Club Deportivo Estrellas del Sur  are a Salvadoran professional football club based in Chirilagua, El Salvador.

Actualmente en tercera división de fútbol profesional. (2022-2023)

They currently play in the Salvadoran Third Division.

Coaches
  Luis Marines

Football clubs in El Salvador